Stigmella cypracma is a species of moth in the family Nepticulidae. It is endemic to New Zealand. The larvae of this species are leaf miners and pupate with their mines. The host species is Brachyglottis repanda. The adult moths are on the wing in February and September to November.

Taxonomy 
This species was first described by Edward Meyrick in 1916 using a specimen collected by George Hudson in November in Karori and named Nepticula cypracma. In 1919 Meyrick, thinking he was describing a new species, also named it Nepticula perissopa. He used as specimen collected by Hudson at Mount Taranaki. In 1928 Hudson described and illustrated the species under the name Nepticula cypracma and also describing it under the name Nepticula perissopa. However he expresses doubt at the distinction between the two species. In 1988 J. S. Dugdale places both these species within the genus Stigmella. In 1989 Hans Donner and Christopher Wilkinson synonymised Stigmella perissopa with Stigmella cypracma. 

The holotype specimen is held at the Natural History Museum, London.

Description 
The larvae of S. cypracma are about 4 mm long and pale green. 

Meyrick described the adult moth of the species as follows:
S. cypracma can be distinguished from similar species S. ogygia and S. hakekeae as it has wings that are broader and more evenly coloured.

Distribution 
This species is endemic to New Zealand. Other than the type locality of Wellington, this species or its mines have been collected from Northland, Bay of Plenty, Taranaki, Whanganui, and Havelock.

Biology and behaviour
Larvae have been recorded from May to October and in December. They mine the leaves of their host plant. The mine is narrow and does not follow a particular pattern, but is strongly sinuous and tends to isolate within its coils areas of tissue which, when withered, can be recognised as brown patches in the leaf. The mine terminates in a blotch. The frass is deposited in one or two rows in the middle of the gallery. The cocoon is made of brown silk within the mine. This makes S. cypracma one of only two species within New Zealand that pupate within their mine. Cocoons with live pupae have been found in May, June, August, September and December.

Adults have been recorded February and from September to November. There are two generations per year.

Habitat and host species 

The larvae feed on Brachyglottis repanda.

References

External links

Holotype specimen for Stigmella cypracma
Lectotype specimen

Nepticulidae
Moths of New Zealand
Moths described in 1916
Taxa named by Edward Meyrick
Endemic fauna of New Zealand
Endemic moths of New Zealand